Dorothy Ludwig is a Canadian shooter from Renfrew, Ontario. She currently resides in Langley, British Columbia. Ludwig first won a bronze medal in pairs shooting at the 2010 Commonwealth Games. In 2011, she won Canada's second gold medal at the Pan American Games in Guadalajara, claiming a spot on the 2012 Olympic team.  At the 2012 Olympics, she finished in 34th place in 10 m air pistol.

References

External links
 Canadian Olympic Committee Profile

1979 births
Living people
People from Renfrew County
Officers of the Order of Canada
Canadian female sport shooters
Trap and double trap shooters
Shooters at the 2011 Pan American Games
Shooters at the 2012 Summer Olympics
Olympic shooters of Canada
Shooters at the 2002 Commonwealth Games
Shooters at the 2010 Commonwealth Games
Shooters at the 2014 Commonwealth Games
Pan American Games gold medalists for Canada
Commonwealth Games gold medallists for Canada
Commonwealth Games silver medallists for Canada
Commonwealth Games bronze medallists for Canada
Commonwealth Games medallists in shooting
Pan American Games medalists in shooting
Medalists at the 2011 Pan American Games
21st-century Canadian women
Medallists at the 2002 Commonwealth Games
Medallists at the 2010 Commonwealth Games
Medallists at the 2014 Commonwealth Games